Corsavy is a commune in the Pyrénées-Orientales department in southern France. It is part of the historical Vallespir comarca.

Geography

Localisation 
Corsavy is located in the canton of Le Canigou and in the arrondissement of Céret.

Population

See also
Communes of the Pyrénées-Orientales department

References

Communes of Pyrénées-Orientales